Kerrick may refer to:

Places in the United States
Kerrick, Illinois, an unincorporated community
Kerrick, Minnesota, a city
Kerrick, Texas, an unincorporated community
Kerrick Township, Pine County, Minnesota

People
Kerrick Majors (died 1987), African-American murder victim
Ginger Kerrick, American physicist

Other uses
Kerrick Sports Sedan Series, part of the Australian National Sports Sedan Series
Kerrick, a character in the 1984 novel West of Eden by Harry Harrison